The 1971 January 22 Surgut Aeroflot Antonov An-12 crash occurred on 22 January 1971, when an Aeroflot Antonov An-12B, registered CCCP-11000, flying from Omsk Tsentralny Airport, in the Soviet Unions (RSFSR), crashed  short of the runway on approach to Surgut International Airport, Surgut, RSFSR. An investigation found the aircraft's ice protection system was ineffective because the engine bleed air valves were closed during the flight; ice therefore built up on the aircraft causing it to go out of control.

Aircraft
The aircraft was an Antonov AN-12B with the aircraft registration 11000 (factory number - 5343610, a serial number showing some basic information about the aircraft, 5 for the last digit of the year of manufacture - 1965, 34 for the factory of origin - the Tashkent aviation factory, 36 for the production batch and 10 for the individual aircraft within that batch) this aircraft left the production line of the V. P. Chkalov Tashkent aviation production association on 3 December 1965 and by 2 February was handed over to the main directorate of the civil air fleet (the governmental organ tasked with overseeing aviation throughout the Soviet Union). The aircraft was then sent to the Syktyvkar aviation department of the Komi territorial directorate of the civil air fleet. At the time of the crash the aircraft had completed 5626 flying hours in total and 2578 landings.

Accident
In the first half of January 1971 CCCP-11000 was one of two Antonov AN-12s which, along with 3 crews from the 75th flying squadron were temporarily based at Omsk airport, these aircraft were used in transporting freight. On January 22 an order was received to fly CCCP-11000 to Syktyvkar, where routine maintenance work was to be carried out on the aircraft. It was decided to combine the flight with the delivery of 12 metric tons of freight to Surgut. The goods to be transported consisted mainly of rolls of netting, plastic floor tiles and other household goods, as well as a C-995 piledriver for use in construction. Aboard were two crews, the flight crew and a relief crew. The flight crew consisted of:
Captain - Sergei Alexeyavich Bakharev
Second officer - Anatoli Petrovich Dekhtarenko
Navigator - Valeriy Konstantinovich Bakhin
Flight mechanic-instructor - Mikhail Ivanovich Kazachkov
Radio operator - Anatoli Antonidovich Tichenko
Steward - Vladimir Mikhayilovich Malinin
The relief crew consisted of:
Captain - Leontiy Andreyevich Butov
Second officer - Anatoliy Mikhailovich Shama
Navigator - Pyotr Stepanovich Azarenkov
Flight mechanic - Anatoliy Mikhailovich Udayev
Radio operator - Nikolai Ivanovich Soklakov
Steward - Igor Ivanovich Pushnikov
Two others were also on board: an engineer from the 75th flying squadron; Nikolai Pavlovich Kayakan and loadmaster; Yevgeniya Rudolfovna Kramar.

At 19:36 Moscow time (21:36 local time), the aircraft was  laterally and  radially from the runway. The crew received the order to perform the third turn of their holding pattern, this instruction was acknowledged by the crew. This was the last communication that took place with the aircraft. 

When the AN-12 was at a distance of to the North-East of Surgut airport at a speed of  conducting a left turn, the aircraft experienced flow separation on the wing as a result of which it entered a progressive left turn and lost altitude. At this point, having deviated from its original course by 110°, and now on a bearing of 40° and with a left bank around 90° the aircraft crashed into the ground in the vicinity of the river Pochekuika and was completely destroyed with the wreckage catching fire.

Causes

Aftermath
In the span of 9 days (22nd and 31st of January 1971) two AN-12 aircraft crashed at Surgut, CCCP-11000 and CCCP-12996. Both crashes occurred under similar circumstances, whilst carrying out the third turn of their landing circuit both aircraft suffered spontaneous rolls due to flow separation on the wing caused by a drop in aerodynamics because of icing, which in turn was caused by ineffective de-icing systems since the hot air intake valve from the engine was not fully open. In order to prevent further catastrophes of the same nature significant improvements were made to the air bleed control systems including an indicator to show the fully open position of the valves. Special tests were also carried out, the results of which helped to clarify the aerodynamic characteristics of the AN-12 during icing. It also lead to changes in many civil aviation governing documents.

References

Aviation accidents and incidents in 1971
Aviation accidents and incidents in the Soviet Union
Airliner accidents and incidents caused by ice
Aeroflot
1971 in the Soviet Union
Accidents and incidents involving the Antonov An-12
January 1971 events in Europe